Udaypur Wildlife Sanctuary (also spelled Udaipur) is a wildlife sanctuary located in West Champaran district of Bihar state, India. It was established in 1978, and covers an area of 8.74 km².

The wildlife sanctuary is predominantly wetland, located on an oxbow lake in the floodplain of the Gandaki River. It is home to a variety of water birds, both resident and migratory. The sanctuary has areas of swamp forest, dry riverine forest, and khair-sissoo forest (Acacia catechu-Dalbergia sissoo). It is in the Lower Gangetic Plains moist deciduous forests ecoregion.

The sanctuary has a rest house. The nearest town and railhead is Bettiah. The sanctuary is under the authority of the Deputy Director of the Champaran Forest Division, headquartered in Bettiah. This sanctuary is about half an hour from Bettiah wetlands.

See also
 Valmiki National Park

References

Lower Gangetic Plains moist deciduous forests
Wildlife sanctuaries in Bihar
West Champaran district
1978 establishments in Bihar
Protected areas established in 1978